Comines may refer to:
 Comines-Warneton, a town in Hainaut, Belgium
 Comines, Nord, a municipality in the Nord department, France
 Philippe de Commines or de Comines (1447-1511), writer and diplomat in the courts of Burgundy and France